The Mass Effect media franchise, developed by BioWare and published by Electronic Arts, is set in the distant future where various extraterrestrial species coexist with humanity. The developers created extensive background lore for the universe of Mass Effect and its alien species, with detailed explanations documenting the complex relationships between the universe's various factions and the setting's phenomena from a scientific perspective. The developers were inspired and influenced by numerous fantasy and science fiction works, as well as real world cultural and scientific concepts. Dark energy, a form of energy theorized to massively affect the universe, forms a key part of the franchise's concept and background. 

The first three main series games is set in the Milky Way galaxy and follows Commander Shepard, a human special forces soldier who discovers an imminent threat to the galactic community from the Reapers, an ancient collective of sentient synthetic starships which harvest all spaceflight-era organic civilizations as part of a repeating cycle that span millennia in length. The fourth main series game is a standalone sequel about a group of settlers who are members of the Andromeda Initiative colonizing the Andromeda Galaxy.  The original trilogy have overall been both commercially successful and critically acclaimed, and the Mass Effect setting has been praised by critics for the believability and depth of its design, lore and narrative themes. The Mass Effect brand has since expanded into a franchise which encompasses a series of novels, comic books, mobile games, an animated film, and a 3D theme park ride, all of which are centered on other characters as protagonists.

Concept and design

The Bioware team was inspired by early space exploration games such as Starflight and Star Control, according to Bioware founder Ray Muzyka. Writer Mike Laidlaw explained that Star Control II heavily influenced the worldbuilding of the Mass Effect series, especially its exploration sequences. Mass Effect was also influenced by diverse and eclectic visual references, from the work of Spanish neo-futurist architect Santiago Calatrava to electron microscope imagery of insects. Artwork by American illustrator Syd Mead in particular represents a significant visual influence for the architecture and living conditions of intergalactic society for the Mass Effect setting, such as the Citadel space station.

The “geography” of the Mass Effect universe is a blend of fictional concepts and realism. The imagery for the setting's astronomical objects is inspired by real-life photographs like wide field Hubble Space Telescope images or shots taken from space shuttles, and real-life locations were included wherever possible to ground the setting as an extension of astronomy. As the Mass Effect universe was inspired by the procedurally generated galaxy of Star Control II, project director Casey Hudson created a spreadsheet in Microsoft Excel that could generate planetary data, including its name, surface temperature, distance from a star, and other statistical information. The developmental team used the generated information to compile lists of viable planets that could be used in the video games, and incorporated the information by adding a predetermined number of planets from the lists into each individual star system on the galactic map, which are mapped out using a proprietary tool within the game engine. Lore for the individual planets was delegated to the writing team, who would seed information throughout the setting. According to game director Mac Walters, the sheer volume of information generated is difficult to follow even for the developmental team, but the "little bits of mystery" also serves to make the world "seem so much deeper and richer", with the potential for some of it to be utilized for possible future stories.

Newcomers to the galactic community, humanity's iteration in the Mass Effect series is meant to be only fairly far in the future enough to be new but not unrecognizable. Through standardizing the different concept art for their clothing, a "common visual language" was found for the human characters. The standard look for all attire for members of the Cerberus organization is derived from the designs for the armor and clothing of Jacob Taylor, a companion character in Mass Effect 2. Some involved fully armored looks, while others had only cloth, or a mix of cloth and armor. During the development of the original trilogy, which was released during the seventh generation of video game consoles, all component armor pieces for a character model had to be fixed onto a single piece of geometry as the developers only had a limited number of polygons to work with. As a result of technological advancements during the development cycle for Mass Effect Andromeda, the developers could place underarmor closer to the body with interchangeable armor pieces that sit on top of it, and were able to limit the amount of stretching to avoid the "pajama armor" effect.

Influences for the series' non-human characters range from real world flora and fauna to visual media like Hellboy or the 1927 film Metropolis. The team hoped to create a setting with the same sense of history as Star Control II, giving each alien race a compelling motivation that enriches the galaxy. The worldbuilding of Mass Effect references the Star Control series with the Krogan-Rachni war, the lost Prothean civilization, and the sentience-harvesting Reapers. The Reapers and their progenitors, the Leviathans, were also inspired by the cosmic horror and Cthulhu Mythos deities from the literary works of H.P. Lovecraft. The salarians are intended to be Mass Effects answer to the "gray alien" trope, the archetypal image of intelligent extraterrestrial life. The geth are meant to represent an example of the dangers of artificial intelligence within the context of the conflict between organic and synthetic intelligence, a central overarching theme in the Mass Effect franchise.

Prior to the commencement of the concept phase for an alien species, the art and design team would look to the writing team for direction. They would ask for a short written paragraph containing a description of the species, their background, and specific but concise details on what they require for the creature. Phase one begins when the paragraph description is given to the concept artists, who are given a lot of freedom to explore ideas about the subject alien species. Once a few concepts have been completed, the team would attempt to move on from phase one by honing on a few ideas, and start working through multiple phases which may increase depending on the idea's complexity. The goal for the artists was to keep honing in and defining the final design, until they come up with something that feels interesting and unique yet grounded and believable.

Once the concept of a particular species is finalized, creation of the character model would begin, where a lot of "back and forth" took place in order to refine character models with high polygon counts. According to Watts, "doing a concept is a piece of art itself, but also building a character is a piece of art", as he recalled that some ideas that worked on paper ended up not working well on a 3-D model. The character model would next be textured and prepared for inclusion into the game. The animation team gets involved early in the process to make sure everything works correctly. Most aliens had to fit into a humanoid skeleton for animation purposes; for example, the batarian's appearance is originally based on a previous design intended for something else, and had "flaps" on the side of their heads; however, in order to wear equipment they had to be changed to a human shape. Similarly, more "outrageous" designs for species like the elcor were made, although modelling and animation constraints would go on to effect their final design. Plans to include a non-humanoid party member never materialized as significant developmental costs would be incurred otherwise.

For many of the races, there was some difficulty in making the characters appear more visually distinct; though team members could add a bit of a visual variation, the faces would be alien enough that these nuances would not be as noticeable to the human eye. To overcome this, art director Derek Watts came up with the idea of different face paints and tattoos for many of the races as additional features. BioWare realized they would be unable to make both male and female versions of all the races due to budgetary concerns, which in part led to the development of the asari as a mono-gendered species. The salarians are intentionally designed to be an androgynous in terms of appearance, while female character models for the krogan and turians were only introduced by Mass Effect 3.

Mass Effect was envisioned as a trilogy from the very beginning as part of the developers' efforts to create a memorable story. Early versions of the first game's plot involved a conflict between humanity and the batarians, originally conceived as a "warmongering" group of "small bat-like creatures". Led by the villainous Saren, the batarians intended to steal the technology of the "Nazari", which was at that point the name of the extinct race that preceded the contemporary races and created most of the technology. Humanity were to be depicted with an inherent ability to access and use the technology of the Nazari, in spite of their lack of technological knowledge; this makes them an important race, drawing much attention from the other species. It would then turn out that humanity were in fact originally a slave race to these Nazari, which explains their innate affinity for the lost technology. This idea was later discarded, with the focus of the narrative turned to the tension between synthetic and organic life and the batarians were replaced with the geth as antagonists to strengthen the human versus machine conflict. The batarians were later redesigned as a four-eyed humanoid species and repurposed as the villains of Bring Down the Sky, a piece of downloadable content for the first Mass Effect.

For the development of subsequent sequels, the developers continued to reference fan reaction to well-received features such as loyalty missions or popular characters, whether from player feedback or from research into fan labor-driven activities. The geth were originally intended to be sidelined within the trilogy's overarching plot following the conclusion of the first Mass Effect; due to the very positive player feedback to the geth, BioWare continued to explore the geth's role for subsequent sequels in response. This had the side-effect of reducing focus on other concurrent plot lines, including that of the insectoid rachni. A proposed alien race's predicted potential for cosplay by the series' fandom based on their character designs was also taken into consideration whenever the final decision is to be made for inclusion.

Premise 

In 2148, an alien artifact had been discovered on Mars which shows that humanity had been studied by an intergalactic species since the Cro-Magnon period. Research of the artifact, in addition to providing new technologies for humanity, led to a further discovery of Pluto's moon Charon as a "mass relay", an alien construct that is capable of transporting any ships faster than light to a nearby mass relay on the galactic scale. The mass relays work by creating a "mass effect", the production of dark energy from a reaction with a dark matter substance known as Element Zero or "eezo" to slingshot spacecraft to the next relay. Element Zero is found to also react with biological entities, giving them limited powers known as "biotics" that evoke the mass effect on a much smaller scale.

Ten years after leaving the Sol system, humanity makes its first contact with an extraterrestrial species, the turians, which erupted into the First Contact War. Though casualties are small on both sides, hostilities were ultimately interrupted by the Citadel Council. Humanity is then welcomed into the collective community of extraterrestrial peoples who live in Citadel space and accept the Council's authority, and learn that the artifacts, mass relays, and the Citadel space station, are all that remains of the Protheans, who are believed to have been the pre-eminent civilization in the Milky Way galaxy who created most of its technology, but have since disappeared tens of thousands of years ago. The Citadel Council welcomes humanity into the Citadel community, providing them with a Systems Alliance embassy and allowing individual members to join the Citadel Security Forces (C-Sec), despite other client species having waited for such a privilege for some time. The Citadel Council soon invites a human to join the Spectres, elite enforcers that use both espionage and force to complete their assignments.

Original Mass Effect trilogy
Over the course of the trilogy, the galactic community come to learn that the Protheans were mostly wiped out over 50,000 years prior by the Reapers, sentient starships that normally occupy the void between the Milky Way and the Andromeda Galaxy. The Reapers appear every 50,000 years with the sole purpose of wiping out emergent organic civilizations as well as any evidence of their own existence, but deliberately leave behind technology which ensure that the organic civilizations of the next cycle develop according to their predetermined specifications. Unlike their predecessors in previous cycles, the Protheans had learned of the Reapers and prepared for their arrival, though they were unable to prevent their own extermination by the Reapers. Their preparations survive into the next cycle, in the form of the Crucible.  The Mass Effect series starts as the nascent appearances of the Reapers in this cycle have occurred, beginning with the indoctrination of a rogue turian Spectre, an influential asari Matriarch, and a "heretic" faction of geth who broke away from the Geth Consensus to further their plans of return.

The Collectors began abducting entire human colonies by the events of Mass Effect 2. Shepard, who had been killed in action during a surprise attack by a Collector ship at the beginning of Mass Effect 2, is reconstructed and revived by Cerberus in the year 2185, following a complex cybernetic engineering process which lasted two years. Shepard sets out to assemble a team of skilled individuals from across the galaxy for a suicide mission into the Omega Four mass relay to stop the Collectors from harvesting more human colonies on behalf of the Reapers. Near the Omega Four relay is Omega space station, which lies outside of Citadel jurisdiction. Ruled by the asari pirate queen Aria T'Loak, Omega serves as the de facto trade capital of the Terminus Systems, a collective of independent states, corporate fiefdoms and pirate domains. It is also popular as an alternative hub for alien species who are unwelcome in Citadel controlled space, or an avenue for criminal activities which contravenes Citadel laws and regulations.

Immediately after the defeat of the Collectors and the destruction of the incomplete Proto-Reaper they were constructing, the Reapers are shown traveling to the Milky Way galaxy from dark space at the ending of Mass Effect 2. The Reaper invasion have commenced by the beginning of Mass Effect 3, with the war's earliest fronts taking place in batarian and human space. Shepard is present on Earth when the Reapers first arrived, and later escapes the human homeworld on the Normandy SR-2 in order to rally the rest of the galactic community against the Reaper threat, and find a solution that will break the Reaper-imposed cycle of harvesting organic species forever.

Mass Effect: Andromeda
Founded in 2176 by Jien Garson, the Andromeda Initiative is a civilian multi-species project created to send scientists, explorers and colonists placed in cryosleep within massive intergalactic arkships on a one-way trip from the Milky Way Galaxy to settle in the Andromeda Galaxy. The Initiative's main objective is to establish a permanent presence in the Heleus Cluster, a seemingly resource-rich frontier of Andromeda, and eventually create a reliable route between both galaxies. Research on the ODSY drive and its core components, which are essential technology for the Initiative's goal to undertake long distance travel to the Andromeda galaxy, was underway by the time of the attack on the Citadel by Sovereign and the geth, the events of which spurred the Initiative to fast track its plans to depart from the Milky Way galaxy.

Races of Mass Effect

Humanity
Headquartered on Earth, the Systems Alliance is the primary military, exploratory, and scientific agency that represents humanity in interstellar politics. It was originally formed as a limited peacekeeping force by multiple human nations—to operate under the mandate by the United Nations—to safeguard humanity as it expanded to new colonies through the mass relay, and during the Reaper invasion, has acted as the emergency governing body of the human race at large for a time. While biotics are common among alien species like the asari, they are rare in humans and often require an implant to channel and improve upon the skill.

As the newest member state to join the Citadel space community by the events of the original trilogy, humanity tend to be underestimated, held in suspicion or looked down upon. Humanity's opinions regarding aliens varies greatly from isolationism to globalism: on Earth, there is concern about how humanity is treated by these other species, and nationalistic pro-human groups advocating militarism, xenophobia, and a "humanity-first" supremacist agenda begin to appear; on fringe colonies, locals are ambivalent, being preoccupied with daily survival in often hostile environments; and "spacers", who may have spent their entire lives residing within starship installations, and generally adopt favorable opinions about multiculturalism.

Alien races
Besides the Reapers, numerous sentient alien races were introduced in the first Mass Effect and its tie-in prequel novel Mass Effect: Revelation, with three enjoying dominant political status within the galactic community. Various artificial intelligence entities and animal species such as the varren, the monkey-esque pyjaks and the gigantic worm-like Thresher Maws are also encountered throughout the franchise's media.
The asari are a mono-gendered humanoid species from the eezo-rich world of Thessia, who are naturally inclined towards biotics. The asari have a bisexual orientation and may reproduce with any gender of any species using their biotic ability to mind meld. Due to this process and a specific code in their DNA, any children they have will also be asari no matter who or what they reproduced with. The asari themselves closely resemble female humans in appearance and anatomy. Asari go through three stages of life and are capable of living for over a thousand years. The asari are depicted as the most politically and culturally influential of all the Milky Way races within the original trilogy. 
The salarians are a warm-blooded amphibian species with a hyperactive metabolism from Sur'Kesh, and are known for their relatively short lifespans compared to other races in the galactic community. Salarians are generally known for their observational capability and non-linear thinking, which manifests as an aptitude for research and espionage. The salarians are known for their covert ops organization, the Special Tasks Group (STG), from which the Council's Spectre organization are based on.
The turians are a bipedal avian species with an exoskeleton from Palaven. Their biological makeup is different from that of most other species, and are culturally rooted in a militaristic society. The turians are the first alien species to have come into contact with humanity within series lore, which inadvertently sparked a brief but vicious period of conflict which is eventually de-escalated due to the intervention of the Citadel Council.
The krogan, a warlike and physically robust species in decline due to the Genophage, a viral-weapon deployed on their homeworld Tuchanka which is designed to sterilize the krogan species and suppress their naturally high birthrate.
The geth are a networked collective of AI programs which usually occupy "mobile platforms" made from flexible synthetic material. When multiple geth programs are brought together, they are capable of forming a "consensus"  to systematically coordinate and share their processing work with each other, which free up cycles for more advanced forms of reasoning and make them capable of more complicated or nuanced tasks. The geth are the most common recurring antagonists in the first Mass Effect, varying in size and power from little bi-pedal, gun toting robots all of the way up to a massive walker known as Colossus. 
The quarians are a nomadic culture of technologically savvy humanoid beings who originally created the geth but were driven out of their homeworld Rannoch following a revolt by their wayward creations. Most similar to the turians in terms of biological makeup, the quarians are never seen outside of their environmental suits by the rest of the galactic community due to their weak immune systems.
The elcor are a species of hulking quadrupeds from a high-gravity world named Dekunna, and their deliberate and conservative psychology is an evolved response to an environment where a fall can be lethal. The elcor communicate among themselves mainly through scent, slight movements, and other forms of body language. As a result, the elcor prefix their sentences with the intended emotion for clarity when communicating with other species as their speech patterns come across as monotone and difficult to comprehend.  
The hanar, an overly polite and philosophically inclined species of jellyfish-like entities from the ocean world Kahje, who worship the Protheans as their progenitors with religious fervor. The hanar communicate using highly developed patterns of bioluminescence, which is translated by other species via machine assistance.

The volus are an ammonia-based species who are known to be aggressive traders and industrialists with a keen grasp of exchange and finance. The volus always wear environmental suits outside of their high pressure homeworld of Irune.
The rachni are an insectoid race of creatures connected by a hive mind, long thought to be extinct following their extermination by the krogan.
The batarians are an isolationist people native to the planet Khar'shan, who are notorious for their piracy as well as their active opposition to humanity's colonization activities around the galaxy.

Mass Effect 2 and its downloadable content introduce several races to the setting, with varying importance in its plot.
 The Collectors are an enigmatic four-eyed insectoid race from a realm beyond the mysterious Omega Four mass relay, where no ship ever return. They were widely dismissed as myths within the Mass Effect universe, but are in fact the deformed remnants of the Prothean race. They are known to conduct trade of hyper-advanced technology in the Terminus Systems in exchange for living samples from various species. 
 The drell, a reptilian species originally from the barren world of Rakhana. They serve the hanar as part of a symbiotic relationship called The Compact.
 The vorcha, a highly aggressive and resilient species from Heshtok with powerful regenerative abilities. 
 The yahg, a large predator species with unrivaled perceptiveness and mental adaptability from the world of Parnack. A member of the species has adopted the guise of the Shadow Broker by the events of Lair of the Shadow Broker.

Mass Effect 3 introduces several Reaper-corrupted versions of the galaxy's races as enemy units. Javik, the last living Prothean, is featured in the From Ashes DLC pack. The Leviathans, an ancient species of colossal aquatic beings who created the AI entity known as the Catalyst, which in turn created the Reapers in the image of its creators, are first introduced in the Leviathan DLC pack.

Mass Effect: Andromeda introduces two other sapient organic races:
The kett, a hostile militaristic species with dense formations of bone growing externally as armor protrusions on their bodies, who regularly attack settlements throughout the Andromeda galaxy.
The angara, an emotionally expressive species native to the Heleus Cluster in the Andromeda galaxy, who are dependent on sunlight for sustenance. By the events of Andromeda, the angara have been waging a decades long war of resistance against the kett.

Reception
The series' setting has garnered a mostly positive reception from commentators. GamesRadar praised the setting's Milky Way galaxy as "so well-constructed that it felt like a decades-old franchise" and its presentation "a high-water mark for video games as a story-telling medium." Similarly, Evan Narcisse enjoyed the "family secrets, tribal grudge matches, and interplanetary political turnabout" depicted throughout the original trilogy, describing them as memorable moments where it felt like players could change lives in both minor or major ways. Kyle Munkittrick from Gizmodo argued that Mass Effect is the most important science fiction universe of the contemporary generation, and that it overshadowed that of other established science fiction franchises due to the depth of its medium as a video game, its message which embraces diversity and pluralism, and its philosophy which meaningfully reflects on the human condition as well as society as a whole. Munkittrick emphasized the significance of Mass Effect as the "first blockbuster franchise in the postmodern era to directly confront a godless, meaningless universe indifferent to humanity". Referencing Munkittrick's observations, Erik Henriksen from the Portland Mercury said what the developers accomplished with their setting is "pretty extraordinary" in spite of its inherent flaws, with the first two games ambitiously and smartly pairing "brave, big-idea genre fiction with visceral thrills and strong characters". Cian Maher from TheGamer said Mass Effect has one of the most fascinating universes in the history of video games, and credited the series' detailed and well-written codex entries that set the rules for the setting and ultimately gave it a convincing degree of verisimilitude. Peter Suderman from Vox noted that while part of the video game series' appeal for players is its fully realized science fiction universe filled with "complex political machinations and a web of long-simmering alien rivalries", the series' commitment to small talk or banter with all sorts of non-player characters through the in-game conversation system is also instrumental in getting players emotionally invested.

Sara Mitchell from NASA's Blueshift blog, produced by the Astrophysics Science Division at the Goddard Space Flight Center, praised the setting for its "impressive level of realism" and noted that much of the in-game imagery for astronomical objects look like it is lifted from a NASA press release. From an academic perspective, Joshua and Ita Irizarry described the Mass Effect universe to be a "landmark entry in the relatively brief history of video games as well as a lucrative topic for speculation, discussion, and analysis".

The alien races of Mass Effect have received acclaim. Justin Carter from Syfy Wire noted that while the original trilogy featured humanity's ascension to galactic prominence as its main narrative, the setting's various alien species were the one aspect that "stole the show". While the asari, the krogan, the quarians and the turians have been subject to significant coverage which discuss their specific roles within the setting at length, some of Mass Effects more unusual races, such as the elcor and the hanar, have also received coverage which is predominantly positive. Several critics are particularly fond of the elcor. For example, the Official Xbox Magazine declared the elcor to be the best new species of 2007. Commentators have lauded the elcor's speech patterns and peculiar behavior as a good source of humor and comic relief, although Hollander Cooper from GamesRadar lamented that the elcor are underutilised within the series.

Analysis
A number of social science topics within the context of the Mass Effect universe have been explored in articles published in academic journals. In his analysis of the series' characters from the perspective of disability studies, Adan Jerreat-Poole observed that biotics represent the series' version of "science-as-magic", a reminder of the inhuman nature of a biotic individual's physiology as the embodiment of "a merging of organic and inorganic materials", which invokes the exhibitions of biological rarities in world history and the spectacle of “extraordinary bodies" as termed by Rosemarie Garland-Thomson, an expert in disability studies. David Callahan analyzed racial and cultural tensions among Mass Effects galactic community, and drew comparisons to multiculturalism in Canada. Eva Zekany from Central European University researched the depiction of interspecies romance within the setting as well as fan reaction to the presentation of said content.

Luke Willcocks from the University of Leicester analyzed the hypothetical properties of Element Zero from a real world scientific basis. He observed that while the asari most closely resemble humans in terms of biology, their blood color is markedly different. He suggested that the logical explanation is because asari blood contains a property that causes its violet-blue coloration at a molecular scale. Willcocks pointed out that in all in-universe depictions of Element Zero, such as the generation of mass effect fields by starships and biotics, it is always portrayed in a shade of blue. He concluded that Element Zero is the source of the blue coloration of asari blood, and since an electrical current could pass through it, the substance is theoretically a metallic semiconductor.

See also 
Dark matter in fiction
List of Mass Effect characters
List of science fiction universes

References

Bibliography

Further reading
Jerreat-Poole, Adan, Sick, Slow, Cyborg: Crip Futurity in Mass Effect The International Journal of Computer Game Research, Volume 20, Issue 1, 2020.
Callahan, David, Don't Fear the Reapers, Fear Multiculturalism: Canadian Contexts and Ethnic Elisions in Mass Effect The International Journal of Computer Game Research, Volume 19, Issue 2, 2019.
Zekany, Eva, "A Horrible Interspecies Awkwardness Thing": (Non)Human Desire in the Mass Effect Universe". Bulletin of Science, Technology & Society, 36(1), 67-77, 2019.
Alvarado, Sebastian and Tajerian, Maral, "How Evolution Defines Mass Effect's Aliens", IGN, March 29, 2012.
Anderson, Ryan, The Evolution of Stars: The Unusual Astronomy of Mass Effect, Halo, and StarCraft II, Kotaku, July 11, 2012

External links 
 The Mass Effect Universe official portal

Fictional elements introduced in 2007
Fictional universes
Mass Effect
Video game locations